The Ladner Exchange is a major transit exchange in the community of Ladner within the city of Delta, British Columbia. Opened on November 24, 1978, it is the primary transit hub for South Delta, serving as a terminus for all but two routes and includes connections to SkyTrain stations in Richmond and Surrey.  There is a 200-space park and ride and kiss and ride adjacent to the exchange.

Structure and location
The exchange is located off-street near the major intersection of Ladner Trunk Road and Highway 17A, providing for easy access for both buses and drivers alike. It also serves multiple destinations nearby, including Delta City Hall, Ladner Leisure Centre and Delta Hospital. There are several open-sided shelters with benches on site. It has the ability to host a variety of standard and articulated buses as well as double-decker buses.

Transit connections

See also
List of bus routes in Metro Vancouver

References

External links
 Ladner Exchange Map (PDF)

TransLink (British Columbia) bus stations
Delta, British Columbia